The Nevada Wolf Pack men's basketball program is a college basketball team that represents the University of Nevada, Reno. The team is currently a member of the Mountain West Conference, which is a Division I conference in the National Collegiate Athletic Association (NCAA). The program began in 1913 and has won 23 regular season conference championships and five conference tournament championships. Nevada won a CBI Title in 2016 vs. Morehead State 2–1 in the series.

Background information
Year founded: 1913
Location: Reno, Nevada
School Colors: Navy and Silver
School Founded: October 12, 1874
Nickname: Wolf Pack
Conference: Mountain West Conference
Arena: Lawlor Events Center (11,536)
Head Coach: Steve Alford

Conference affiliations
No affiliation (1913, 1921–1924, 1940–1953)
Pacific Coast Athletic Association (PCAA) (1914–1920)
Far Western Conference (FWC) (1925–1939, 1954–1969)
West Coast Athletic Conference (WCAC) (1970–1979)
Big Sky Conference (BSC) (1980–1992)
Big West Conference (BWC) (1993–2000)
Western Athletic Conference (WAC) (2001–2011)
Mountain West Conference (MWC) (2012–present)

Team history
All-Time D-1 Record: 954–742 (.562%) as of June 13, 2019
NAIA Tournament Appearances: (1) – 1946
NAIA Tournament Record: 2–1
NCAA tournament Record: 6–10
NCAA Tournament Appearances: (10) – 1984, 1985, 2004, 2005, 2006, 2007, 2017, 2018, 2019, 2023
NIT Record: 4–4
NIT Appearances: (5) – 1979, 1997, 2003, 2010, 2012
CBI Record: 5–3
CBI Appearances: (3) – 2008, 2009, 2016
Highest National Ranking
No. 5 (Coaches Poll), December 31, 2018
No. 5 (Associated Press Poll), November 26, 2018

Regular Season Conference Championships (23)
PCAA: (1) – 1920
FWC: (10) – 1927, 1928, 1932, 1938, 1956, 1957, 1958,1959, 1961, 1964, 1966
BSC: (2) – 1984, 1985
WAC: (6) – 2004, 2005, 2006, 2007, 2008, 2012
MW: (3) – 2017, 2018, 2019

Conference tournament championships (5)
BSC: (2) – 1984, 1985
WAC: (2) – 2004, 2006
MWC: (1) – 2017

Venue history
University Gymnasium – built 1896, capacity unknown; located northwest of the Mackay School of Mines between the current Ansari Building and the Pennington Student Achievement Center
Virginia Street Gymnasium – built 1945, capacity 3,500; located on Virginia Street opposite College Drive; currently used as a study and training center for Nevada athletes.
Lawlor Events Center – built 1983, capacity 11,536; located at the corner of North Virginia Street and East 15th Street; current home of Wolf Pack basketball.

Head coaches

Postseason results

NCAA Division I tournament results
The Wolf Pack have appeared in the NCAA Division I tournament nine times, with a combined record of 6–10.

NCAA Division II Tournament results
The Wolf Pack have appeared in the NCAA Division II tournament four times. Their combined record is 1–6.

NAIA Division I Tournament results
The Wolf Pack have appeared in the NAIA Division I Tournament one time. Their combined record is 2–1.

NIT results
The Wolf Pack have appeared in the National Invitation Tournament (NIT) five times. Their combined record is 5–5.

CBI results
The Wolf Pack have appeared in the College Basketball Invitational (CBI) three times. Their combined record is 5–3. They were CBI champions in 2016.

Player honors

Retired numbers

The Wolf Pack have two number officially retired, Edgar Jones' number 32, and Nick Fazekas's number 22.

Conference player of the year
Kevin Soares, 1992 (Big Sky)
Kirk Snyder, 2004 (WAC)
Nick Fazekas, 2005, 2006, 2007 (WAC)
Luke Babbitt, 2010 (WAC)
Deonte Burton, 2012 (WAC)
Caleb Martin, 2018 (Mountain West)

NBA players
Luke Babbitt
Nick Fazekas
Jalen Harris
Johnny High
Edgar Jones
Armon Johnson
Caleb Martin
Cody Martin
JaVale McGee
Cameron Oliver
Kevinn Pinkney
Ramon Sessions
Kirk Snyder
David Wood

References

External links
 

 
Basketball teams established in 1913